Pendarves is a Cornish surname. Notable people with the surname include:

 Alexander Pendarves, English politician
 John Pendarves, English Puritan controversialist
 Edward Wynne-Pendarves, English politician
 The Pendarves estate at Troon, Cornwall

See also
 Pendarvis